Beckerman is a surname. Notable people with the surname include:

Alyssa Beckerman (born 1981), American gymnast
Bernard Beckerman (contemporary), American Shakespeare scholar and theater director
Ilene Beckerman (born 1935), American writer
Jon Beckerman (born 1969), American television producer, director, and writer
Kyle Beckerman (born 1982), American soccer player
Marty Beckerman (born 1983), American alternative journalist, humorist, and author
Michael Beckerman(contemporary), American trade association President
Ray Beckerman (contemporary), American commercial litigation attorney and blogger
Sandra Beckerman (born 1983), Dutch archaeologist and politician
Shloimke (Sam) Beckerman (1883–1974), American klezmer clarinetist
Sidney Beckerman (musician) (1919–2007), American klezmer clarinetist

See also
Beckermann

 Surnames
Jewish surnames